Ponsoonops is a genus of spiders in the family Oonopidae. It was first described in 2014 by Bolzern. , it contains 22 species.

Species
Ponsoonops comprises the following species:
Ponsoonops bilzae Bolzern, 2014
Ponsoonops bollo Bolzern, 2014
Ponsoonops boquete Bolzern, 2014
Ponsoonops coiba Bolzern, 2014
Ponsoonops duenas Bolzern, 2014
Ponsoonops fanselix Bolzern, 2014
Ponsoonops frio Bolzern, 2014
Ponsoonops hamus Bolzern, 2014
Ponsoonops lavega Bolzern, 2014
Ponsoonops lerida Bolzern, 2014
Ponsoonops lucha Bolzern, 2014
Ponsoonops micans (Simon, 1893)
Ponsoonops mirante Bolzern, 2014
Ponsoonops pansedro Bolzern, 2014
Ponsoonops panto Bolzern, 2014
Ponsoonops salimsa Bolzern, 2014
Ponsoonops samadam Bolzern, 2014
Ponsoonops sanvito Bolzern, 2014
Ponsoonops tacana Bolzern, 2014
Ponsoonops viejo Bolzern, 2014
Ponsoonops vuena Bolzern, 2014
Ponsoonops yumuri Bolzern, 2014

References

Oonopidae
Araneomorphae genera
Spiders of Mexico
Spiders of Central America
Spiders of the Caribbean
Spiders of South America